The 17th Annual Helpmann Awards for live performance in Australia was held on 24 July 2017 at the Capitol Theatre, Sydney. Nominations were announced on 19 June 2017. The ceremony was hosted by Jan van de Stool and Tim Draxl.

Winners of major awards included play The Drover's Wife, opera Saul and musical The Book of Mormon.

Recipients and nominations

Theatre

Musicals

Opera and Classical Music

Dance and Physical Theatre

Contemporary Music

Other

Industry

Lifetime Achievement

References

Helpmann Awards
Helpmann Awards
Helpmann Awards
Helpmann Awards
Helpmann Awards, 17th
Helpmann Awards